George Latham (died 1871) was an English architect and surveyor, who practised from an office in Nantwich, Cheshire.

Personal life
Latham married the daughter of the Wesleyan Methodist minister of Nantwich, the Reverend Thomas Gee. They had at least three sons; the second, Baldwin Latham (1836–1917) became a civil engineer and meteorologist; the youngest, Edwin Davenport Latham, also became a civil engineer. In 1850, Latham was living on Hospital Street in Nantwich.

Works
His works include the country houses, Arley Hall and Willington Hall, several churches, Northwich Union Workhouse, and the Savings Bank and market hall in Nantwich.  Hartwell et al. in the Buildings of England series consider Arley Hall to be his finest work.  He designed buildings in a variety of architectural styles, including Neoclassical, Jacobean, and Georgian.

Unsuccessful projects
Latham was approached by John Tollemache, 1st Baron Tollemache, with the prospect of becoming the architect for Peckforton Castle, but was not appointed to the position and received £2,000 in compensation.  The architect ultimately appointed was Anthony Salvin. Latham was also commissioned by Hungerford Crewe, 3rd Baron Crewe, to carry out alterations to Crewe Hall in 1836, but was replaced by Edward Blore.

See also

List of works by George Latham

References
Citations

Sources

 

19th-century English architects
People from Nantwich
1871 deaths
Date of birth unknown
Architects from Cheshire